Geordie are a British rock band from Newcastle upon Tyne, most notably active in the 1970s. With notable hits, "Can You Do It", "Electric Lady" and "Goodbye Love".

History

Formation (1971–1980)
The original (from February 1972) Geordie line-up included: Vic Malcolm (lead guitar), Tom Hill (bass guitar), Brian Gibson (drums) and Brian Johnson (lead vocals). Their first single, "Don't Do That" broke into the Top 40 of the UK Singles Chart in December 1972. In March 1973, Geordie released their debut album, Hope You Like It on EMI label. Trying to compete with such British glam rock outfits as Slade and Sweet (Geordie supported the former on a UK tour, as well as the latter at a concert at the Rainbow Club, London in March 1973), they achieved UK Top 10 status with "All Because of You" (April 1973) and had a UK Top 20 hit with "Can You Do It" (July 1973). They also had several appearances on BBC Television including 15 appearances on Top of the Pops, one of which was in November 1972.

In the early 1970s, Geordie toured Australia regularly and gained a solid following in Newcastle, New South Wales, due to the "Newcastle" connection and the song "Geordie's Lost his Liggie" gained popularity and airplay in Newcastle. They were one of the regular touring bands to play at the "art deco" Savoy Theatre in Lambton. Their second album, Don't Be Fooled By The Name (1974), including a cover of traditional "House of the Rising Sun", failed to yield a hit.

After their 1976 album Save the World, frontman Johnson left for a solo project. The band's album, No Good Woman, in 1978 consisted of three unreleased tracks with Johnson and new material recorded by Malcolm with future Dire Straits keyboardist Alan Clark, vocalist Dave Ditchburn, bassist Frank Gibbon, and drummer George Defty. Johnson had meanwhile begun to perform as Geordie in a new line-up, sometimes also called Geordie II, in which he was the only original member. The band signed a recording contract in 1980, but finally folded that spring when Johnson replaced Bon Scott in AC/DC.

Post break-up and Reunion Tour of Geordie II (1980–2018)
After AC/DC's lead singer Bon Scott died in February 1980, AC/DC chose Brian Johnson (whose vocal talent had previously been praised by Scott) to take over lead vocal duties. Johnson first appeared with AC/DC on their 1980 album, Back in Black.

In 1982, the original Geordie, but without Johnson, re-grouped as a quintet and went on to record an album titled No Sweat in 1983 with new singer Rob Turnbull and additional guitarist David Stephenson. The album was released on heavy metal independent record label, Neat Records. Critically acclaimed but with no major success, they disbanded for the second time. They re-grouped in the middle of 1980s, but Malcolm left, and they later changed their name to Powerhouse, to release an eponymous album in 1986, before disbanding indefinitely.

At the end of 2001, during an AC/DC hiatus, Johnson had a one-off reunion, for a short UK tour, with Geordie's 1977–80 line-up, performing largely hard rock cover versions. They were known as Geordie II.

Rob Turnbull (Dr. Rob) is a member of the band Gadji as of 2013. In 2014, Vic Malcolm formed a new band, Dynamite, with Rick Mort and recorded an album, Rock 'Til You Drop, in 2014 on indie label Tabitha Records.

Revival (2018–present)
Two of the original founding members, bassist Tom Hill, and drummer Brian Gibson relaunched Geordie with a new line-up that includes Mark Wright on vocals and Steve Dawson on guitar. The group launched a YouTube channel with an announcement of the band reformation with plans to record new material. An official band website saw the light of day early 2023.

Discography

Studio albums (as Geordie)
Hope You Like It (1973) (Red Bus)
Don't Be Fooled by the Name (1974) (Red Bus)
Save the World (1976) (Red Bus)
No Good Woman (1978) (Red Bus – Landmark)
No Sweat (1983) (Neat Records)

Studio album (as Powerhouse)
Powerhouse (1986) (Ambush/EMI)

Compilation albums
Geordie – Masters of Rock (1974) (EMI)
Geordie featuring Brian Johnson (1980) (Red Bus)
Strange Man (1982) (compilation) (Red Bus)
Keep on Rocking (1989) (digitally remixed & remastered) (Anchor/DCC)
Rocking with the Boys (1992) (Australian compilation) (Raven)
A Band from Geordieland (1996) (compilation – 24 tracks) (Repertoire)
The Very Best of Geordie (1997) (compilation) (CMC/Play records)
The Best of Geordie (1998) (compilation) (Platinum)
Can You Do It? (1999) (compilation) (Delta)
The Singles Collection (2001) (compilation) (7T's records)
No Sweat (2002) (re-release compiled with 4 live sessions recorded at the BBC) (Castle Records)
Can You Do It (2003) (compilation) (Pickwick – Holland)
Unreleased Tapes (2005) (12 rare tracks) (OVC Media – Russia)
The Very Best of Geordie – The original versions (2009) (compilation) (Spectre/Universal records)
Keep on Rockin' – The Very Best Of (2009) (compilation) (Spectre/Universal records)
Greatest Hits (2012) (compilation) (Zebra Studio records)
The Albums (2016) 5 CD 66 track set of all five albums recorded by Geordie.

Singles

Band members 
1972–1977:
 Brian Johnson (vocals)
 Vic Malcolm (guitar, vocals) (1972-1975, 1976–1977)
 Tom Hill (bass)
 Brian Gibson (drums)
 Micky Bennison (guitar) (1975-1976)

1978:
 Dave Ditchburn (vocals)
 Vic Malcolm (guitar)
 Alan Clark (keyboards)
 Frank Gibbon (bass)
 George Defty (drums)

Geordie II – 1977–1980, 2001:
 Brian Johnson (vocals)
 Derek Rootham (guitar)
 Dave Robson (bass)
 Davy Whittaker (drums)

1982–1985:
 Rob Turnbull (vocals)
 Vic Malcolm (guitar)
 David Stephenson (guitar)
 Tom Hill (bass)
 Brian Gibson (drums)

1986:
 Rob Turnbull (vocals)
 Martin Metcalf (guitar)
 Tom Hill (bass)
 Brian Gibson (drums)

2018–2021:
 Mark Wright (vocals)
 Steve Dawson (guitar)
 Tom Hill (bass)
 Brian Gibson (drums)

2021–present:
 Terry Slesser (vocals)
 Steve Dawson (guitar)
 Tom Hill (bass)
 Brian Gibson (drums)

Timeline

See also 
List of glam rock artists
List of bands from Newcastle, United Kingdom
List of performers on Top of the Pops

References

External links 
Geordie.Band Official

Angel.dk

English hard rock musical groups
Musical groups established in 1972
English glam rock groups
Musical groups from Newcastle upon Tyne
Musical groups disestablished in 1980
Musical quartets
EMI Records artists
Neat Records artists